The Most Beautiful Villages in Russia is an association established in Russia in 2014 to promote rural tourism. It is part of an international network including Les Plus Beaux Villages de France and The Most Beautiful Villages in Japan.

List of villages
Arkhangelsk Oblast

Buryatia

Karelia

Novgorod Oblast

Leningrad Oblast

Pskov Oblast

Tver Oblast

Vologda Oblast

Yaroslavl Oblast

References

External links
 Krasa Derevni - List of villages

Russia
Tourism in Russia
2014 establishments in Russia
Organizations established in 2014